Madonna Blyth (born 30 November 1985) is an Australian field hockey player who competed in the 2008, 2012 Summer Olympics and 2016 Summer Olympics. She also plays for and captains the Queensland Scorchers in the Australian Hockey League. Blyth has been the Captain of the Hockeyroos since 2009. Her debut game for Australia was in Argentina, as an 18-year-old at the 2004 Champions Trophy. She started playing hockey when she was 5, and joined the representative scene at 15, winning gold with her team at the 2001 Australian Youth Olympic Festival.

She was nominated for the FIH's player of the year in 2013, and has been named on the FIH All-Stars team in 2007, 2009 and 2010, as well as being named Player of the Tournament at the 2009 Champions Trophy.

She played her 250th game for Australia in June 2013, and is only the fifth Australian woman to reach this number.

At the 2014 Commonwealth Games, she captained Australia to victory and scored the winning goal in the penalty shootout against England.

After playing since she was 5, Madonna has now retired from hockey and is quickly making a name for herself in the Western Australian cricket scene. After a strong start she was quickly promoted into the star studded A grade side alongside Emma King, Heather Graham, Megan Banting and Nicole Bolton. She is a specialist fielder for the Subiaco Floreat Cricket Club women's A grade side.

References

External links
 
 

1985 births
Living people
Australian female field hockey players
Olympic field hockey players of Australia
Field hockey players at the 2008 Summer Olympics
Field hockey players at the 2012 Summer Olympics
Field hockey players at the 2006 Commonwealth Games
Field hockey players at the 2010 Commonwealth Games
Field hockey players at the 2014 Commonwealth Games
Commonwealth Games gold medallists for Australia
Field hockey players at the 2016 Summer Olympics
Commonwealth Games medallists in field hockey
21st-century Australian women
Medallists at the 2006 Commonwealth Games
Medallists at the 2010 Commonwealth Games
Medallists at the 2014 Commonwealth Games